The 2014 Karshi Challenger was a professional tennis tournament played on hard courts. It was the eighth edition of the tournament which was part of the 2014 ATP Challenger Tour. It took place in Qarshi, Uzbekistan between 19 and 24 May 2014.

Singles main-draw entrants

Seeds

 1 Rankings are as of May 12, 2014.

Other entrants
The following players received wildcards into the singles main draw:
  Karen Khachanov
  Shonigmatjon Shofayziyev
  Sanjar Fayziev
  Temur Ismailov

The following players received entry from the qualifying draw:
  Denys Molchanov
  Anton Zaitcev
  Mikhail Ledovskikh
  Laurent Rochette

Doubles main-draw entrants

Seeds

1 Rankings as of May 12, 2014.

Other entrants
The following pairs received wildcards into the doubles main draw:
  Shonigmatjon Shofayziyev /  Vaja Uzakov
  Omad Boboqulov /  Mikhail Esipov
  Sanjar Fayziev /  Temur Ismailov

Champions

Singles

 Nikoloz Basilashvili def.  Chase Buchanan, 7–6(7–2), 6–2

Doubles

  Sergey Betov /  Aliaksandr Bury def.  Gong Maoxin /  Peng Hsien-yin, 7–5, 1–6, [10–6]

External links
Official Website

Karshi Challenger
Karshi Challenger
Karshi Challenger
Karshi Challenger